The 1934–35 season was the 38th in the history of the Western Football League.

The Division One champions for the fourth time in their history were Yeovil and Petters United. The winners of Division Two were Swindon Town Reserves. There was again no promotion or relegation between the two divisions this season.

Division One
After Taunton Town left the league, Division One remained at seven clubs, with one new club joining:

Cardiff City Reserves, rejoining after leaving the league in 1933.

Division Two
Division Two remained at eighteen clubs after Poole Town left and one new club joined:

Bristol Rovers "A"

References

1934-35
4